Kesmeşeker (meaning sugarcube) is a Turkish rock band, founded around 1990 by Cenk Taner (vocals, guitar), Belen Ünal (guitar), Tayfun Çağlar (vocals, bass), and Melih Rona (drums).

After 20 years and eight recorded albums, only Cenk Taner of the founding members still continues to perform with the band.

Albums
1991 Dipten ve Derinden
1993 Aşk ve Para	
1995 Tut Beni Düşmeden
1998 İnsülin
1999 İçinde İçindekiler Vardır
2001 İzin Vermedi Yalnızlık (Cenk Taner)
2004 Kum
2011 Doğdum Ben Memlekette
2013 Yoldan Çıkmış Şarkılar (Cenk Taner)
2017 Kadıköy

External links
 kesmeseker.org, Official web site of the band
 Kesmeseker Fan Website, A fan website

Turkish rock music groups